Patricia Southern (born 1948) is an English historian of classical Rome.

Early life
Born in 1948  near Altrincham, Cheshire, Southern studied Ancient History and Archaeology with the Universities of London and Newcastle upon Tyne.

Career
Southern was the librarian of the Department of Archaeology at the University of Newcastle upon Tyne from 1983 to 1996 and later at the library of the Newcastle upon Tyne Literary and Philosophical Society. She has published 13 books on Roman history and archaeology and contributed numerous articles on Roman history to the BBC History website and the academic Roman studies journal Britannia.

She has also written a history of her home town of Altrincham.

Southern's first two books The Roman Cavalry and The Late Roman Army were co-authored and illustrated by Karen Dixon. Dixon also illustrated several other books in the publisher's catalogue. Dixon's analysis of morale in the late Roman Army was well received  and influenced the development of the study of military psychology in history pioneered by John Keegan in The Face of Battle.

Selected publications
 Dixon, Karen & Southern, Pat The Roman Cavalry 1992, Batsford, London 
 Southern, Pat. "Comparative Frontier Studies", in Scott, E. (ed) Theoretical Roman Archaeology: First Conference Proceedings, 1996, Aldershot, Avebury. pp.147–154.  
 Southern, Pat & Dixon, Karen The Late Roman Army 1996, Batsford, London 
 Southern, Pat Domitian: Tragic Tyrant 1997, Batsford 
 Southern, Pat Mark Antony 1998, Tempus 
 Southern, Pat Cleopatra 1998, Tempus 
 Southern, Pat The Roman Empire from Severus to Constantine 2001, Routledge 
 Southern, Pat Augustus 2001, Routledge 
 Southern, Pat Julius Caesar 2001, Tempus 
 Southern, Pat Pompey the Great: Caesar's Friend and Foe  2003, The History Press 
 Southern, Pat The Roman Army: A Social and Institutional History 2007, Oxford University Press 
 Southern, Pat Antony and Cleopatra 2009, The History Press 
 Southern, Pat Ancient Rome: The Rise and Fall of an Empire 753BC-AD476 2009, Amberly 
 Southern, Pat Empress Zenobia: Palmyra's Rebel Queen 2009, Hambledon Continuum 
 Southern, Pat The Story of Altrincham 2008, Amberly

References

External links
 Rome's Pivotal Emperors by Pat Southern (BBC History website)
 Third Century Crisis of the Roman Empire by Pat Southern (BBC History website)

1948 births
Living people
English historians
People from Altrincham